Christa Campbell (born December 7, 1972) is an American actress and producer.  Campbell is best known for her roles in 2001 Maniacs, Mozart and the Whale, Lonely Hearts, The Wicker Man, Cleaner, Day of the Dead, Lies & Illusions, The Mechanic, Drive Angry, Straight A's, The Big Wedding, and The Iceman.

In 2011, Campbell partnered up with producer Lati Grobman to form Campbell-Grobman Films, which has produced numerous films such as Texas Chainsaw 3D, Straight A's, and The Iceman.

Campbell-Grobman Films
Founded by executives Campbell and Lati Grobman, Campbell-Grobman Films has produced seven films, including Texas Chainsaw 3D and The Iceman, starring Michael Shannon and Winona Ryder. Campbell and Grobman work within various genres, including horror, romantic comedy, action, and documentary. At the WorldFest-Houston film festival, their documentary The Resort won the Special Jury Award.

Filmography

Movies

Television

Producer

Shows

References

External links

 
 Official MySpace

1972 births
American film actresses
American television actresses
Living people
20th-century American actresses
21st-century American actresses
Actresses from Oakland, California
Film producers from California
American women film producers